Litzelsdorf is a town in the district of Oberwart in the Austrian state of Burgenland.

Geography 
The small town is located in the south of Burgenland.

History 
The  town of Litzelsdorf along with the whole Burgenland belonged to the Western part of the Kingdom of Hungary until 1920/21, and its official name was Lődös. After World War I Burgenland was awarded to the newly formed Republic of Austria as a result of the Treaties of St. Germain and Trianon. Since 1921 Litzelsdorf belongs to the newly formed state of Burgenland.

Population

Politics
The current mayor of Litzelsdorf is Peter Fassl (Austrian People's Party = ÖVP) and the vice mayor is Martin Gerbafczits (Social Democratic Party of Austria = SPÖ).

Coat of arms

The coat of arms is coloured in blue and gold and divided into 3 parts. The first part is blue and shows a golden triangle with rays. This is a symbol for the trinity – and a column has been built a long time ago as a sign of adoring trinity. 
In the second part, which is colored in gold, a blue gear wheel can be seen and in the last part, coloured in blue ears (botany) can be seen. These are symbols for trade and agriculture. coats of arms

References

External links
 website of Litzelsdorf

Cities and towns in Oberwart District